Kaahumanu may refer to:

Early rulers of the Kingdom of Hawaii:
 Kaahumanu Queen Kaahuman I (1768–1832)
 Kaahumanu II Elizabeth Kīnau, or  Kaahumanu II (c. 1805–1839)
 Kaahumanu III Miriam Auhea Kekāuluohi, or  Kaahumanu III (1794–1845)
 Kaahumanu IV Victoria Kamāmalu, or  Kaahumanu IV (1838–1866)

Other people:
 Virginia Kaihikapumahana Wilcox known as Kahoa Kaahumanu
 Lani Ka'ahumanu
 Kapumahana Ka'ahumanu Walters (born 1979)

Other:
 Kaahumanu Society civic society
 Queen Kaahuman Highway, part of the Hawaii Belt Road
 Kaahumanu Avenue, Hawaii Route 32 on Maui

See also
 Kuhina Nui office held by above rulers